Ericeia pallidula is a moth in the family Erebidae. It is found in Indonesia (Buru).

References

Moths described in 1929
Ericeia